John Golding  (10 September 1929 – 9 April 2012) was a British artist, art scholar, and curator, perhaps best known for his seminal text Cubism: A History and an Analysis, 1907–1914, first published in 1959 and later revised in several subsequent editions.

He taught "Art of the Modern Period" at the Courtauld Institute of Art from 1959 to 1981 and was elected a Fellow of the British Academy in 1994. As a curator "he made his public mark with another Picasso scholar, Elizabeth Cowling, by curating two groundbreaking Tate [Gallery in London] exhibitions: Picasso: Sculptor/Painter, in 1994, and Matisse/Picasso, in 2002-03, which also travelled to the Grand Palais in Paris and the Museum of Modern Art in New York."

References

20th-century British artists
20th-century British writers
British art historians
British curators
Commanders of the Order of the British Empire
1929 births
2012 deaths
British artists